Oaxaca FilmFest was an eight-day long international film festival that was permanently cancelled in 2022 without taking place, once it could no longer hide the fact that it devolved into a calculated scam to prey on unknowing filmmakers. At its start, the festival was held every autumn in the Mexican city of Oaxaca from 2010 - 2019, and again from 2021. The festival is composed of various categories and offered a large space in its selection to emerging directors and screenwriters.

History
The festival was founded by Ramiz Adeeb Azar, with the first edition of the festival held in November 2010. MovieMaker magazine listed it as one of "50 Film Festivals Worth the Entry Fee" three times. Oaxaca FilmFest has included the works of artist such as Guillermo del Toro, Robert De Niro, Clint Eastwood, Spike Lee, Neil LaBute, Diego Luna, Takashi Miike, Martin Scorsese, Bill Plympton, Donald Sutherland, Luke Wilson, and, recently, Brian A. Metcalf.

Controversy
The festival has been involved in recent controversy, with many ex-members of the festival team publishing an open letter on December 14, 2020 in which they "disclaim any responsibility or relationship" with the festival under "Ramiz Pour Azar (aka Ramiz Adeeb Azar)."  They write that they "share the concerns of the filmmakers community regarding [recent festival] activities, including but not limited to the selection process, management, accountability and destination of the funds collected...."
2022 - the festival was cancelled, the websites are defunct, and they are not refunding the money we sent to join the festival.
.  The festival owes us $698 US Dollars and have stopped all websites and email addresses.

Awards

Award Winners for Best Global Feature

References

External links
 Official Website
 IMDb

Film festivals in Mexico
Autumn events in Mexico
Tourist attractions in Oaxaca